Gabriel Farnsley House, also known as the Behrens House, is a historic home located in Franklin Township, Floyd County, Indiana.  It was built about 1856, and is a two-story, five bay, plantation style frame dwelling.  It has clapboard siding, a one-story rear shed addition, and features a two-tier front gallery supported by square piers.

It was listed on the National Register of Historic Places in 1982.

References

Houses on the National Register of Historic Places in Indiana
Houses completed in 1856
Houses in Floyd County, Indiana
National Register of Historic Places in Floyd County, Indiana